Tyrone Green (born ) is a South African rugby union player for Harlequins in the Premiership  . He is a utility back that can play as a fullback, wing, fly-half or centre.

Career

He joined Premiership Rugby side Harlequins ahead of the 2020–21 season. On his full debut he scored a brace of tries after starting on the wing against the Newcastle Falcons.

He was named man of the match during Harlequins 43-36 defeat of Bristol Bears in the Premiership semi-final, a game in which Green scored two tries as Quins recovered from 28 points down to win. He started the following week in the Premiership final against Exeter. Harlequins won the game 40-38 in the highest scoring Premiership final ever.

References

External links
 

South African rugby union players
Living people
1998 births
South African people of British descent
People from Klerksdorp
Rugby union fly-halves
Rugby union centres
Rugby union wings
Golden Lions players
South Africa Under-20 international rugby union players
White South African people
Lions (United Rugby Championship) players
Harlequin F.C. players
Rugby union players from North West (South African province)